Parsons Hospital was "a small proprietary hospital in Queens" that was transformed into one focused to serving a local largely immigrant population. The hospital, which opened in 1963, closed in 1988, two years after it "was purchased by Asian American doctors."

History
In 1986 a group of doctors purchased the 100-bed hospital "to serve the Asian population in Flushing, Queens." It became a division of Flushing Hospital Medical Center in 1988 the latter was acquired by New York Hospital in April 1996. Parsons closed within months of being "cut off from Medicare and Medicaid reimbursement" for serious violations.

The building was sold with the understanding that the new owner would demolish it.

References

Hospitals in Queens, New York
1963 establishments in New York City